Carnival in Goa, also called "Carnaval", "Intruz", "Entrado", or (colloquially) "Viva Carnival"  refers to the festival of carnival, or Mardi Gras, in the Indian state of Goa. Though significantly smaller than the well-known Rio Carnival or the Portuguese Carnival of Madeira, the Goa Carnival is the largest in India and one of the few traditional celebrations of the Western Christian holiday in Asia. The current version of the Goa Carnival was modelled after the Rio Carnival by a local musician named Timoteo Fernandes and imposed in 1965 to attract tourists. It has since turned into a major tourist attraction for the small state.

Origin 
While the roots of the Carnival in Goa date back to the introduction of Roman Catholic traditions during the Portuguese conquest of Goa, being celebrated since the XVIII century, the festival itself fell into obscurity during the later days of colonialism, as Portugal's authoritarian regime known and is celebrated on the same day as Portugal Estado Novo limited freedom of assembly and press.

After the end of Portuguese rule, the Brazilian version of the festival was imposed by Timoteo Fernandes in 1965, a Goan musician who modeled it after the famed Rio Carnival. This was done to attract more tourism.  Today, the urban parade includes floats from local villages, commercial entities, and cultural groups. It is still organised in a very traditional manner, including by the staging of streetside local plays, in the coastal taluka of Salcete. According to the Government of Goa's Department of Tourism, the carnival is "Goa's most famous festival and has been celebrated since the 18th century."

The Carnival usually starts off on Fat Saturday (known as ) and concludes on Fat Tuesday (known as Shrove Tuesday), just before Ash Wednesday and the first day of the Catholic season of Lent.  In Panjim, the capital of Goa, the festival is complemented by Grape Escapade, a local wine festival, and a dance at Samba Square in the centrally-located Garden of Garcia da Orta.

According to local tradition, during Carnival Goa is taken over by King Momo, usually a local resident who presides over the festival during the four-day span.  King Momo traditionally proclaims the Konkani message  (English: “Eat, drink and make merry”). In 2021 the King Momo for the Goa Carnival was Mr. Sixtus Eric Dias from Candolim.

Parade 
The parade usually begins on Fat Saturday evening with a procession headed by King Momo. In 2021 the King Momo for the Goa Carnival was Mr. Sixtus Eric Dias from Candolim. Balloons, horse-drawn carriages, decorated bullock carts and elaborate floats are the highlights of the parade. The festivities during Goa Carnival include dancing troupes, revelers wearing masks and costumes, live music, sports competitions, floats and parades, and food and drinking.

Dates 
In 2022, the festival was celebrated from 26 February – 1 March. In the urban areas, individual float parades were held in the Goan cities and towns of Panjim, Margao, Vasco and Mapusa.

See also 
 Culture of Goa
 Portuguese Goa
List of topics on the Portuguese Empire in the East

References

External links
Donna Noronha's Viva Carnival (link via JazzGoa)

Festivals in Goa
Carnivals in India